e is the sixteenth album by Adrian Belew, released in 2009 (though not billed as such, it is also his first studio recording with the Adrian Belew Power Trio). The album consists of a single extended instrumental piece, presented as a suite in five parts. Belew performed the entire piece with an orchestra in Amsterdam, the Netherlands, on 28 February 2011.

Track listing
All songs written by Adrian Belew
 "a" – 0:30
 "a2" – 3:38
 "a3" – 3:07
 "b" – 6:13
 "b2" – 3:36
 "b3" – 1:22
 "c" – 6:19
 "d" – 6:01
 "d2" – 2:51
 "e" – 0:56
 "e2" – 7:58

Personnel

Musicians
 Adrian Belew – guitars
 Julie Slick – bass
 Eric Slick – drums

Technical
 Adrian Belew – producer
 Saul Zonana – engineer
 Gary Platt – mixing engineer
 Anders Peterson – assistant engineer
 Mark Colman – artwork and photography

Adrian Belew albums
Albums produced by Adrian Belew
2009 albums